Achurum sumichrasti, the sumichrast toothpick grasshopper, is a species of slant-faced grasshopper in the family Acrididae. It is found in Central America and North America.

References

 Otte, Daniel (1995). "Grasshoppers [Acridomorpha] D". Orthoptera Species File 5, 630.

Gomphocerinae
Insects described in 1861